Preemraff Lysekil is an oil refinery located at Brofjorden near the Swedish city of Lysekil.

Production 
Originally named Scanraff, the refinery was taken into use in 1975. In 2003, the facility was acquired by Preem. Refined products are mainly transported from Preemraff Lysekil using tanker ships. There is no rail connection and the road connections are poor.

Preem is the largest supplier of petroleum products in Sweden and its two refineries, Preemraff Göteborg in Gothenburg, and Preemraff Lysekil in Lysekil represent 80 percent of Sweden's refining capacity. The annual capacity of Preemraff Lysekil is around 11 million metric tons of crude oil.

The highly visible flares, towers and chimneys also makes the refinery a navigation mark for vessels entering Brofjorden.

See also 
Preemraff Göteborg

Panorama

References

External links 

Preem

Oil refineries in Sweden
Buildings and structures in Västra Götaland County